Corethrovalva allophylina is a moth of the family Gracillariidae. It is known from South Africa.

The larvae feed on Allophylus transvaalensis. They mine the leaves of their host plant. The mine has the form of a moderate, irregular, whitish, transparent blotch-mine. It is oblong or more or less rounded.

References

Endemic moths of South Africa
Acrocercopinae
Moths of Africa
Moths described in 1961